The Yakima Valley AVA was the first American Viticultural Area established within Washington state, gaining the recognition in 1983. The most widely planted varietals in the area are Chardonnay, Riesling, Merlot, Cabernet Sauvignon, Pinot gris, and Syrah. Nearly 40% of Washington state yearly wine production is made from Yakima Valley grapes. In addition to grapes, the Yakima Valley is also home to several fruit orchards growing apples, cherries, nectarines, peaches, pears and plums. Around the town of Zillah, there is the Zillah Fruit Loop driving tour through the area's orchards and vineyards. The area is also home to nearly 80% of the US hop production.

Geography and climate 
The Yakima Valley's borders include the sub-AVA of the Rattlesnake Hills to the north, the Horse Heaven Hills to the south and Red Mountain forming parts of its eastern boundaries. The Snipes Mountain AVA also lies within its boundaries. To the west, the Cascade Range forms a natural border and creates a rain shadow over the area which requires the use of irrigation in viticulture. The cities of Yakima and Prosser are the main commercial centers with many wineries located in or around them. To the west, Mount Adams dominates the landscape along with the Yakima River on its eastward flow to the Columbia River.

Overall, the temperature of the Yakima Valley is more temperate than the rest of the greater Columbia Valley AVA, with average temperatures being 5 °F (3 °C) to 10 °F (6 °C) cooler.

History 

A French winemaker from Alsace-Lorraine named Charles Schanno is credited with planting the first vines in the area in 1869. Schanno purchased the cuttings from a vineyard in The Dalles, Oregon and the Hudson's Bay Company outpost at Fort Vancouver. In the early 20th century, an attorney from Tacoma named William B. Bridgeman pioneered the modern wine industry in the Yakima Valley. Bridgeman helped draft some of the state's earliest irrigation laws for wine growing and planted his first vineyard in 1914. Many of the vineyards established in the Yakima Valley during this period came from Bridgeman's cuttings. Following the repeal of Prohibition, Bridgeman opened Upland Winery and hired Erich Steenborg as winemaker. Together they were influential in promoting the use of varietal labelling for wines made in the Yakima Valley, including the state's first dry Riesling.

In 1917, the Washington State Legislature passed an act setting aside  of sagebrush desert near Prosser to become an agriculture research center known as the Irrigation Branch Experiment Station (today known as the Irrigated Agriculture Research and Extension Center, and operated jointly by Washington State University and the USDA). In 1937, the research center hired Walter Clore as an assistant horticulturist. Under Clore's guidance, the center expanded into grape growing with Vitis labrusca, Vitis vinifera and American hybrid grape plantings. Research from the center would become vital to the growing Washington wine industry.

In the 1980s, along with the rest of the Washington wine industry, the Yakima Valley saw a boom in the plantings of new vineyards and the openings of new wineries such as Hogue Cellars and Covey Run both opening in 1982, followed by Chinook Wines in 1983.

Vineyards 

The Yakima Valley AVA is home to some of the state's oldest vineyards with nearly every major Washington wine maker securing at least some of their grapes from this appellation. The vineyard is known as the primary grape supplier to Columbia Winery. It was from this vineyard that winemaker David Lake produced the first Syrah in Washington state. Chardonnay is a popular planting in this cool climate appellation with most wine growers preferring a single clonal variety. Nearly any grape can ripen at some location within this diverse AVA. The most sought after sites are located on the eastern edge of the AVA near 
Red Mountain, Prosser and Benton City. The AVA also includes Boushey Vineyard, ranked by as one of the top vineyards in Washington State.

Sub-appellations
As the Washington wine industry began to focus more on terroir, three sub-appellations have been created for areas within the Yakima Valley AVA that demonstrate unique microclimates and soil conditions which crafted different wines from their neighboring areas.  The Red Mountain AVA was created in 2001, the Rattlesnake Hills AVA was created in 2006 and the Snipes Mountain AVA created in 2009.

References

External links 
Yakima Valley Wine Region

American Viticultural Areas
Geography of Benton County, Washington
Washington (state) wine
Geography of Yakima County, Washington
1983 establishments in Washington (state)